Adam James Black (born 24 May 1992) is an English footballer who played as a forward.

Career
He started as a trainee with Accrington Stanley and made one senior appearance for the club, coming on as a substitute for John Miles on 10 October 2009 in a Football League Two match with Cheltenham Town. He left the club in May 2010 and joined Alsager Town.

United States
Black then went to study at Oklahoma City University for three years where he played college soccer, scoring 41 goals during his time. After leaving college, he played for USL side Tulsa Roughnecks during the 2015 season, scoring three times in 25 games.

Trivia
Whilst a sixteen-year-old with Accrington in 2008 he was selected to compete in the Skill Skool competition against his teammate Scott Craggs, as part of Accrington's appearance on Soccer AM.

Notes

References

External links
Profile at Oklahoma City University

1992 births
Living people
English footballers
Association football forwards
Accrington Stanley F.C. players
English Football League players
Footballers from Liverpool
English expatriate footballers
Alsager Town F.C. players
Austin Aztex players
FC Tulsa players
Expatriate soccer players in the United States
USL League Two players
USL Championship players
English expatriate sportspeople in the United States